is a Japanese machinery manufacturer. The company is known internationally for their production of military and civilian firearms. However, they also manufacture products such as machine tools, sweeping vehicles and windows and doors.

History 

The  was established by Sakichi Toyoda in February, 1907. The company was renamed to its current name at the end of World War II and restarted manufacturing textile machinery.

Weapon manufacturing

Military use 
Toyoda's Loom Works began manufacturing armaments in 1932.

During World War II 
Since 1940, Howa has been heavily involved in the Japanese armaments industry, and was involved in manufacturing the famous Arisaka rifle series including Type 99 rifle, parts of Type 38 rifle, artillery pieces, airplane parts, and ammunition. Many of their World War II-era weapons are highly sought after collectors' items.

Post WWII 
Howa created copies of the US M1 Garand and the M1 carbine for the Japanese Self Defense Forces during the early days of the Cold War.

Howa also designed and manufactured firearms for JGSDF use, including the following types (models):
Howa Type 64
 Howa Type 89 
 AR-18 (licensed production for Armalite Inc.)
 Howa Type 96
 Howa Type 20
 Howa 84mm Recoilless Rifle (licensed copy of the Swedish Carl Gustaf 84 mm Recoilless Rifle)
 12.7mm Spotting rifle mount for Type 60 recoilless rifles.
 Mortar mount for Type 96 mortar carrier

During the early 1970s, Howa produced the AR-18 and AR-180 5.56mm assault rifle as a license from Armalite Inc. of Costa Mesa, California, which marketed the rifle to various military forces. Japanese government restrictions on the sales of military small arms to foreign countries eventually forced Howa to cease production of the AR-18/AR-180, moving production back to Armalite.

Civilian use 
Howa has produced a long line of civilian hunting and target practice rifles in a range of calibers.  Howa has also manufactured products or components for other firearm companies, such as Mossberg, Smith & Wesson, and Weatherby. The Smith & Wesson Model 1000 shotgun of the 1970s and 1980s was designed and manufactured by Howa.

Howa M300
The Howa M300 or Howa Carbine is a small semi-automatic rifle for consumer use (carbine) developed by Howa Industries. Based on the M1 / M2 carbine military automatic rifle designed in the United States, it was developed for hunting and sports. Produced between 1960-1996.

Howa Golden Bear
Howa Golden Bear is a bolt-action rifle that was once manufactured by Howa Industries between 1967-1979.

Howa M1500
The Howa M1500, a bolt-action rifle, is produced in sporting, varmint and heavy barrel configurations, which are sold in the U.S. via Legacy Sports International. In Canada, various retailers stock Howa rifles, including Prophet River, Cabela's, and North Pro Sports. In the United Kingdom, Highland Outdoors imports the Howa rifles.

See also

 List of Japanese military equipment of World War II

Sources

External links
  Official Website 
  Legacy Sports page on Howa Bolt Action Rifles 
  Howa Rifles in UK 

Firearm manufacturers of Japan
Companies listed on the Tokyo Stock Exchange
Manufacturing companies established in 1907
Companies based in Aichi Prefecture
Machine tool builders
Japanese companies established in 1907
Japanese brands